"" is the official anthem of Åland, an autonomous Swedish-speaking province of Finland. Adopted in 1922, the anthem's words are by John Grandell, and the music was composed by Johan Fridolf Hagfors. The song was first performed during the song festival in Mariehamn 1922. In Åland, the song is mostly sung on Midsummer's Eve and on the national day of Åland on 9 June. The song originally had four verses, but the third verse has been omitted for a long time when the song is sung and often when it appears in print.

Lyrics

See also 
 National anthem of Finland
 National Anthem of Sweden

Notes

References

External links 
Ålänningens sång MP3

History of Åland
Finnish music
European anthems
Åland society
Swedish-language songs